General Sir Peregrine Maitland, GCB (6 July 1777 – 30 May 1854) was a British soldier and colonial administrator. He also was a first-class cricketer from 1798 to 1808 and an early advocate for the establishment of what would become the Canadian Indian residential school system.

Born at Longparish House in Longparish, Hampshire, the eldest of five sons of Thomas Maitland of Lyndhurst, Hampshire, (d. 1798) by his spouse Jane, daughter of Edward Mathew, General of the Coldstream Guards by his wife Lady Jane (d. 21 August 1793), daughter of Peregrine Bertie, 2nd Duke of Ancaster and Kesteven. Thomas Maitland possessed plantations in the parish of St. Thomas Middle Island on the island of St. Christopher in the West Indies.

Military career

After joining the 1st Foot Guards at the age of 15 as an ensign he went on to serve in Flanders in 1794, by which time he had achieved his promotion to lieutenant. In 1798, he took part in the unsuccessful landing at Ostend. In the Peninsular War, he served at both the Battle of Vigo, and at Corunna, for which he was awarded a medal. He took part in the Walcheren in 1809. During the later stages of the Peninsula War was second in command of his regiment at Cadiz, and later at the Battle of Seville.

He served with distinction at Quatre Bras and the Battle of Waterloo. Promoted in early June (3June 1815) to major general, he was assigned to the First Corps, under overall command of the Prince of Orange. On 18June, the day of Waterloo, he commanded two battalions of the 1st Foot Guards, each 1000-men strong and led the Guards in repelling the final assault of the French Imperial Guard. For his service at Waterloo, Maitland was created a Knight Commander of the Order of the Bath, (KCB) on 22June 1815, the Dutch Order of William and the Russian Order of St. Vladimir. For their part, the 1st Foot Guards were granted the honorary title of 'First or Grenadier Regiment of Foot Guards'.

He was appointed lieutenant governor of Upper Canada in 1818 and supported the Family Compact that dominated the province. He attempted to suppress and reform pro-American tendencies in the colony and resisted demands of radicals in the government. In his role Maitland was the first to propose the civilizing techniques that would eventually lead to the establishment of the Canadian Indian residential school system. He believed that while a shift from hunting to agricultural pursuits would assist with civilizing Indigenous populations, it was gaining the influence of children that would lead to success. In an 1820 report to the Colonial Office he argued for the introduction of industrial schools to minimize the children's exposure to the savage influence of their families. His tenure in Upper Canada ended in 1828 when he was appointed lieutenant-governor of Nova Scotia serving there from 1828 until 1834.

Maitland went to India and became commander in chief of the Madras Army in 1836 serving for two years. In 1843 he was appointed Colonel of the 17th (Leicestershire) Regiment and in 1844 Governor of the Cape Colony, but was removed during the Xhosa War. He is still highly respected in the Kingdom of Lesotho for his judgment on the border issue between the Orange River Afrikaners and the Basotho of King Moshoeshoe I, which, had it been implemented, would have secured the economic future of the kingdom. He was made a Knight Grand Cross of the Order of the Bath on 6 April 1852.

Lieutenant Governor of Nova Scotia 
Maitland became the Lieutenant Governor of Nova Scotia on 29 Nov. 1828, with the added responsibility of commander-in-chief of the forces in the Atlantic region. He was popular. Certainly, his strongly moral conduct influenced Halifax's society. By insisting on walking to church, he effectively ended the garrison parades on Sunday, the city's major social event, and he publicly denounced the open market that day.

Maitland was responsible for the settlement reached for Pictou Academy. In dealing with immigration and settlement, he had lands laid out in Cape Breton at crown expense so that the 4,000 immigrants expected that year could be legally placed and systematically settled.

In October 1832 Maitland went to England on leave, presumably because of his health, and the government was placed in charge of Thomas Nickleson Jeffery. Though he continued to conduct official correspondence from England, he never returned to North America and he was succeeded in Nova Scotia by Sir Colin Campbell in July 1834.

First-class cricket career
Maitland was an amateur first-class cricketer who made 27 known appearances in first-class cricket matches from 1798 to 1808.

He was mainly associated with Marylebone Cricket Club (MCC) and he also played for Surrey and Hampshire.

Family

Peregrine Maitland was the eldest of five sons of Thomas Maitland (died 1797) and Jane Mathew (1759-1830), daughter of Major General Edward Mathew and Jane Bertie. He had three sisters, and his eldest sister Jane married in 1800 a Lieutenant Colonel Warren of the Third Foot Guards. Maitland's maternal aunt married James Austen, brother of Jane Austen.

Maitland married twice: (1) on 8 June 1803, in St George's, Hanover Square, (Westminster), to Louisa (d. 1805), daughter of Sir Edward Crofton, 2nd Baronet, and (2) at the Duke of Wellington's HQ during the occupation of Paris, 9 October 1815, Lady Sarah Lennox (1792–1873), one of the daughters of the 4th Duke of Richmond. Despite the initial opposition of her father, the marriage took place after the intervention and support of the Duke of Wellington. When the Duke of Richmond was appointed Governor-in-Chief of Canada, he appointed Maitland as Lieutenant-Governor of Upper Canada.

By his first wife, he had one son, Peregrine Maitland b. 1 May 1804. By his second wife he had at least seven children:
 Sarah (1817–1900), who married Thomas Bowes Forster (1802–1870), Lieutenant-Colonel in the Madras Army.
 Charlotte Caroline Maitland (9 Dec 1817-8 Jan 1897), married John George Turnbull (10 Aug 1790-2 Jan 1872) on 17 Jul 1837
 Charles Lennox Brownlow Maitland (27 Sep 1823-5 Jan 1891)
 Jane Bertie Maitland (abt 1826-27 Apr 1885)
 Emily Sophia Maitland (1827-16 Dec 1891), married Frederick Herbert Kerr (30 Sep 1818-Jan 1896) on 13 Jan 1846
 George Maitland (1830-1831) (buried at St. Paul's Church (Halifax))
 Eliza Mary Maitland (1832), married John Desborough (24 Jan 1824-14 Jan 1918) on 14 Jul 1857
 Georgina Louisa Maitland (aft 1832-5 Jan 1852), married Thomas Eardley Wilmot Blomefield (died 15 Jan 1896) on 2 Jan 1844
 Horatio Lennox Arthur Maitland (13 Mar 1834-29 Mar 1904)
He was buried at St Paul's Church in Tongham in Surrey.

Maitland in popular fiction
In his novel Les Misérables Victor Hugo credits Maitland (or Colville) with asking for the surrender of the Imperial Guard and receiving General Cambronne's reply of "Merde". (Chapter XIV. The Last Square)

Legacy 

Maitland, Hants County, Nova Scotia is named after him.
Maitland Street, Dartmouth, Nova Scotia is named after him, as is Maitland Street in London, Ontario., as is Maitland Street, Maitland Place and Maitland Terrace in Toronto, Ontario.
The Church of St. John the Evangelist Anglican in Niagara Falls, Ontario was constructed in 1825 largely through the efforts of Lieutenant-Governor Sir Peregrine Maitland. The church remained in regular use until 1957.
Maitland, Ontario, on the St. Lawrence River is named after him.

In New South Wales, Australia, the town of Maitland bears his name. It is one of a series of settlements founded in the years following Waterloo named for Wellington and his subordinate commanders, both from Waterloo and the Peninsula. These include Wellington, Orange, Picton, Grahamstown (Sir Thomas Graham), Pakenham (Sir Edward Pakenham) and Beresfield (Sir William Carr Beresford - misspelt).

In South Africa Maitland, Cape Town, a light industrial and residential suburb, the Maitland River west of Port Elizabeth and numerous streets in the country are named after him.

References

Further reading
 Sherwood, George, editor, The Pedigree Register, London, September, 1908, pps:154-5.
 Bannerman, W. Bruce, FSA, editor, Miscellanea Genealogica et Heraldica, 4th series, London, 1908, vol.2, p. 317.
 Summerville, Christopher J. (2007) Who Was Who at Waterloo, Pearson Education pps:257-261

External sources 
 CricketArchive record
 Sir Peregrine Maitland Letter RG 244 Brock University Library Digital Repository

|

|-

|-

|-

|-

1777 births
1854 deaths
People from Test Valley
Lieutenant-Governors of Upper Canada
English Anglicans
Governors of the Colony of Nova Scotia
British Army generals
British Army personnel of the Napoleonic Wars
Governors of the Cape Colony
Grenadier Guards officers
Knights Grand Cross of the Order of the Bath
English cricketers
English cricketers of 1787 to 1825
Marylebone Cricket Club cricketers
Hampshire cricketers
Surrey cricketers
Surrey and Marylebone Cricket Club cricketers
Recipients of the Order of St. Vladimir, 3rd class
Knights Third Class of the Military Order of William
Recipients of the Waterloo Medal
Residential schools in Canada
Lord Yarmouth's XI cricketers
Marylebone Cricket Club and Homerton cricketers